The 1983 World Rhythmic Gymnastics Championships were held in Strasbourg, France on November 10–11, 1983. They served as the qualification process for the first Olympic program of rhythmic gymnastics to be held in Los Angeles in 1984, although most of the gymnasts from Eastern Europe, which had the most gifted rhythmic gymnasts, ended up not participating in the Games due to the boycott by the Communist Bloc.

Participants
The following countries sent competitor(s): Australia, Austria, Belgium, Brazil, Bulgaria, Canada, China, Cuba, Cyprus, Czechoslovakia, Denmark, East Germany, Finland, France,  Hungary, Israel, Italy, Japan, Netherlands, New Zealand, North Korea, Norway, Poland, Portugal, Romania, Spain, Sweden, Switzerland, United Kingdom, United States, Soviet Union, West Germany, and Yugoslavia

Individual

Groups
Countries who participated in the group competition are as follows.

Medal table

Individual Final

Individual All-Around

Individual Hoop

Individual Ball

Individual Clubs

Individual Ribbon

Group

Preliminaries

Finals

References
RSG.net

External links
FIG - International Governing Body for Rhythmic Gymnastics

Rhythmic Gymnastics World Championships
R
R
Rhythmic Gymnastics Championships
World Rhythmic Gymnastics Championships